Francisco Márquez Villanueva (March 21, 1931 - June 15, 2013) was a literary critic and Arthur Kingsley Porter Professor of Romance Languages and Literatures Emeritus at Harvard University.

References 

1931 births
Harvard University faculty
2013 deaths
University of Seville alumni
Spanish literary critics
American literary critics